Eric Deschamps is an artist whose work has appeared in role-playing games.

Career
His Dungeons & Dragons work includes interior art for Sharn: City of Towers (2004), Explorer's Handbook (2005), Dragon Magic (2006), Complete Mage (2006), Fiendish Codex II: Tyrants of the Nine Hells (2006), Complete Scoundrel (2007), Magic Item Compendium (2007), Expedition to the Demonweb Pits (2007), Complete Champion (2007), Rules Compendium (2007), and the fourth edition Player's Handbook (2008), Manual of the Planes (2008), and Player's Handbook 2 (2009).

He is known for his work on the Magic: The Gathering collectible card game.

References

External links
 Eric Deschamps' website
 

Living people
Role-playing game artists
Year of birth missing (living people)